Electric Earthquake (1942) is the seventh of seventeen animated Technicolor short films based upon the DC Comics character of Superman, originally created by Jerry Siegel and Joe Shuster. This animated short was created by the Fleischer Studios.  The story runs about eight minutes and covers Superman's adventures in stopping a madman from destroying Manhattan with electronically induced earthquakes. It was originally released on May 15, 1942. This is the first of the films to make it clear that the action is taking place in Manhattan.

Plot

The story begins with a view of the city, lowering to a view of the ground underneath. Deep under the docks, several large wires are connected to the bedrock. Following the wires away from the coast along the ocean floor, it is shown that they all converge in a strange underwater capsule. An elevator-like object emerges from the top and rises to an abandoned fishing house infested with rats. A man exits the elevator and heads toward the city in a motorboat.

Later, at the Daily Planet, a Native American man warns Lois Lane, Clark Kent, and Perry White that they must run a report that Manhattan belongs to his people and should be given back to them. The Planet crew judges him to be crazy, and his threats to be empty... at least, everyone but Lois, who follows him to his motorboat. Hiding in the back, Lois is taken to the deserted fishing house on the water and sees his elevator. The man catches her watching him in the elevator's reflection, and calmly invites her to follow him, promising an amazing story.

The elevator lowers into the underwater capsule, and the man offers her a seat, then pushes a button which pins her arms and legs to the chair as a precautionary measure. Stepping up to the controls, he starts up his earthquake machine, sending a powerful surge of electricity through one of the wires and into the bedrock under the city. The large explosion causes the entire city to shake, and runs a large crack through the Daily Planet building. Clark takes advantage of the commotion to change into his Superman costume.

In one leap, Superman dives into the ocean and notices the several wires embedded in the rock. He pulls one of them out only to have it explode in his face, flinging him the ground and piling him with bedrock. He pushes the rock away and pulls at a few more, only to have the wires writhe with electric current and wind around him. At one point, Superman comes up for air only to have one of the wires wind around his neck and pull him down.

Finally, Superman follows the wires to the underwater capsule and pulls them out from its base, causing explosions which destroy the machine. As water fills the capsule, the villain takes the elevator to the surface, leaving Lois trapped as the water in the capsule slowly rises. Superman spots the elevator and catches the villain at the top, but is told that Lois is trapped, and darts back down to save her. The villain, meanwhile, loads the elevator with dynamite and sends it down after him. Superman, however, saves Lois in time, and captures the villain as he is making a getaway in his motorboat.

Later, as the Daily Planet reports Superman's latest heroic deed while the villain is implied to be arrested and sent to jail for his rampage, Clark and Lois are seen watching the now-rebuilt Manhattan from a cruise ship. Clark remarks, "You know, Lois, the old island looks just as good as ever". Lois replies, "That's right, Clark. Thanks to Superman".

Cast
 Bud Collyer as Clark Kent / Superman
 Joan Alexander as Lois Lane
 Julian Noa as Perry White
 Jackson Beck as the Narrator, Indian Scientist

References

External links
 
 
 Electric Earthquake at the Internet Archive
 Electric Earthquake at the Internet Movie Database

1942 films
1942 animated films
1940s American animated films
1940s animated short films
1940s animated superhero films
Superman animated shorts
Fleischer Studios short films
Short films directed by Dave Fleischer
Paramount Pictures short films
Films about earthquakes